is a Japanese former road cyclist. He is currently the manager for the developmental team Team Eurasia.

Major results

1993
 3rd Grand Prix Waregem
1994
 6th Japan Cup Cycle Road Race
1995
 1st  Road race, National Road Championships
1996
 1st Tour de Okinawa
1998
 5th Road race, National Road Championships
1999
 1st Overall Tour de Hokkaido
1st Stage 3
2000
 2nd Overall Tour de Hokkaido
1st Stage 2
 5th Japan Cup Cycle Road Race
2001
 3rd Time trial, National Road Championships
 4th Overall Tour of Japan
2002
 3rd Grand Prix Criquielion
2003
 3rd Time trial, National Road Championships
2004
 7th Tour de Okinawa
2005
 4th Tour de Okinawa
2006
 4th Time trial, National Road Championships
 8th Tour de Okinawa
2008
 5th Time trial, National Road Championships

References

External links

1970 births
Living people
Japanese male cyclists
Sportspeople from Tokyo
20th-century Japanese people
21st-century Japanese people